Corilla is a genus of air-breathing land snails, terrestrial pulmonate gastropod mollusks in the family Corillidae. This family has no subfamilies (according to the taxonomy of the Gastropoda by Bouchet & Rocroi, 2005). It has been synonymised with Atopa Albers, 1850 and Helix (Corilla) Adams & Adams, 1855.

Species
Corilla adamsi (Gude, 1914)
Corilla anax (Benson, 1865)
Corilla beddomeae (Hanley & Theobald, 1876)
Corilla carabinata (Férussac, 1821)
Corilla colletti Sykes, 1897
Corilla erronea (Albers, 1853)
Corilla fryae Gude, 1896
Corilla gudei Sykes, 1897
Corilla humberti (Brot, 1864)
Corilla lesleyae Barnacle, 1956
Corilla odontophora (Benson, 1865)

References

External links

Corillidae